Aristotelian may refer to:
 Aristotle (384–322 BCE), Greek philosopher
 Aristotelianism, the philosophical tradition begun by Aristotle
 Aristotelian ethics
 Aristotelian logic, term logic
 Aristotelian physics, the natural sciences
 Aristotelian Society, founded at a meeting on 19 April 1880
 Aristotelian theology
 Aristotelian tragedy